Destiny Lalotoa Vaeao (born January 15, 1994) is an American football defensive tackle for the Vegas Vipers of the XFL. He was signed by the Philadelphia Eagles as an undrafted free agent in 2016 after playing college football at Washington State.

Professional career

Philadelphia Eagles
Vaeao was signed by the Philadelphia Eagles as an undrafted free agent on May 5, 2016. He made the Eagles final roster, playing in all 16 games recording 15 tackles, two sacks and a forced fumble. Vaeao recorded 10 tackles in his second season and won Super Bowl LII 41-33 against the New England Patriots.

On October 16, 2018, Vaeao was waived/injured by the Eagles and was placed on injured reserve. He was released on October 24, 2018.

New York Jets
On November 19, 2018, Vaeao was signed to the New York Jets practice squad. He was promoted to the active roster on December 29, 2018.

Carolina Panthers
On April 8, 2019, Vaeao signed with the Carolina Panthers. He was placed on injured reserve on August 28, 2019. He was waived from injured reserve on September 24.

New Jersey Generals
Vaeao was drafted by the New Jersey Generals of the United States Football League in the 24th round of the 2022 USFL Draft. He was transferred to the team's inactive roster on April 22, 2022, due to a quadriceps injury. He was moved back to the active roster on May 6.

Vegas Vipers
The Vegas Vipers selected Vaeao in the second round of the 2023 XFL Supplemental Draft on January 1, 2023.

References

External links
Philadelphia Eagles bio

1994 births
Living people
Players of American football from American Samoa
American sportspeople of Samoan descent
American football defensive tackles
Washington State Cougars football players
Philadelphia Eagles players
New York Jets players
Carolina Panthers players
New Jersey Generals (2022) players
Vegas Vipers players